Zheleznodorozhny City District may refer to:
Zheleznodorozhny City District, Russia, several city divisions in Russia
Zheleznodorozhny City District, alternative name of Zaliznychnyi District, a city district of Lviv, Ukraine
Zaliznytsia Raion, Simferopol, a city district of Simferopol, Ukraine

See also
Zheleznodorozhny (disambiguation)